Philip George Zimbardo (born March 23, 1933) is an American psychologist and a professor emeritus at Stanford University. He became known for his 1971 Stanford prison experiment, which was later severely criticized for both ethical and scientific reasons. He has authored various introductory psychology textbooks for college students, and other notable works, including The Lucifer Effect, The Time Paradox, and The Time Cure. He is also the founder and president of the Heroic Imagination Project.

Early life
Zimbardo was born in New York City on March 23, 1933, to a family of Italian immigrants from Cammarata in Sicily. Early in life he experienced discrimination and prejudice, growing up poor on welfare and being Italian. He was often mistaken for other races and ethnicities such as Jewish, Puerto Rican or black. Zimbardo has said these experiences early in life triggered his curiosity about people's behavior, and later influenced his research in school.

He completed his B.A. with a triple major in psychology, sociology, and anthropology from Brooklyn College in 1954, where he graduated summa cum laude. He completed his M.S. (1955) and Ph.D. (1959) in psychology from Yale University, where Neal E. Miller was his advisor. While at Yale, he married fellow graduate student Rose Abdelnour; they had a son in 1962 and divorced in 1971.

He taught at Yale from 1959 to 1960. From 1960 to 1967, he was a professor of psychology at New York University College of Arts & Science. From 1967 to 1968, he taught at Columbia University. He joined the faculty at Stanford University in 1968.

Stanford prison study

Background
In 1971, Zimbardo accepted a tenured position as professor of psychology at Stanford University. With a government grant from the U.S. Office of Naval Research, he conducted the Stanford prison study in which male college students were selected (from an applicant pool of 75).

After a mental health screening, the remaining men were randomly assigned to be "prisoners" or "guards" in a mock prison located in the basement of the psychology building at Stanford. 
Prisoners were confined to a 6' x 9' cell with black steel-barred doors. The only furniture in each cell was a cot. Solitary confinement was a small unlit closet.

Zimbardo's goal for the Stanford Prison study was to assess the psychological effect on a (randomly assigned) student of becoming a prisoner or prison guard.

A 1997 article from the Stanford News Service described the experiment's goals in more detail:
Zimbardo's primary reason for conducting the experiment was to focus on the power of roles, rules, symbols, group identity and situational validation of behavior that generally would repulse ordinary individuals. "I had been conducting research for some years on deindividuation, vandalism and dehumanization that illustrated the ease with which ordinary people could be led to engage in anti-social acts by putting them in situations where they felt anonymous, or they could perceive of others in ways that made them less than human, as enemies or objects," Zimbardo told the Toronto symposium in the summer of 1996.

Experiment
Zimbardo himself took part in the study, playing the role of "prison superintendent" who could mediate disputes between guards and prisoners. He instructed guards to find ways to dominate the prisoners, not with physical violence, but with other tactics, verging on torture, such as sleep deprivation and punishment with solitary confinement. Later in the experiment, as some guards became more aggressive, taking away prisoners' cots (so that they had to sleep on the floor), and forcing them to use buckets kept in their cells as toilets, and then refusing permission to empty the buckets, neither the other guards nor Zimbardo himself intervened. Knowing that their actions were observed but not rebuked, guards considered that they had implicit approval for such actions.

In later interviews, several guards told interviewers that they knew what Zimbardo wanted to have happen, and they did their best to make that happen.

Less than two full days into the study, one inmate pretended to suffer from depression, uncontrolled rage and other mental dysfunctions. The prisoner was eventually released after screaming and acting in an unstable manner in front of the other inmates. He later revealed that he faked this "breakdown" to get out of the study early to focus on school. This prisoner was replaced with one of the alternates.

Results

By the end of the study, the guards had won complete control over all of their prisoners and were using their authority to its greatest extent.  One prisoner had even gone as far as to go on a hunger strike. When he refused to eat, the guards put him into solitary confinement for three hours (even though their own rules stated the limit that a prisoner could be in solitary confinement was only one hour). Instead of the other prisoners looking at this inmate as a hero and following along in his strike, they chanted together that he was a bad prisoner and a troublemaker. Prisoners and guards had rapidly adapted to their roles, stepping beyond the boundaries of what had been predicted and leading to dangerous and psychologically damaging situations. Zimbardo himself started to give in to the roles of the situation. He had to be shown the reality of the study by Christina Maslach, his girlfriend and future wife, who had just received her doctorate in psychology. Zimbardo reflects that the message from the study is that "situations can have a more powerful influence over our behaviour than most people appreciate, and few people recognize [that]."

At the end of the study, after all the prisoners had been released and the guards let go, everyone was brought back into the same room for evaluation and to be able to get their feelings out in the open towards one another. Ethical concerns surrounding the study often draw comparisons to the Milgram experiment, which was conducted in 1961 at Yale University by Stanley Milgram, Zimbardo's former high school friend.

More recently, Thibault Le Texier of the University of Nice has examined the archives of the experiment, including videos, recordings, and Zimbardo's handwritten notes, and argued that "The guards knew what results the experiment was supposed to produce ... Far from reacting spontaneously to this pathogenic social environment, the guards were given clear instructions for how to create it ... The experimenters intervened directly in the experiment, either to give precise instructions, to recall the purposes of the experiment, or to set a general direction ...In order to get their full participation, Zimbardo intended to make the guards believe that they were his research assistants.".  Since his original publication in French, Le Texier's accusations have been taken up by science communicators in the United States. In his book Humankind - a hopeful history (2020) historian Rutger Bregman points out the charge that the whole experiment was faked and fraudulous; Bregman argued this experiment is often used as an example to show people easily succumb to evil behavior, but Zimbardo has been less than candid about the fact that he told the guards to act the way they did. More recently, an APA psychology article reviewed this work in detail  and concluded that Zimbardo encouraged the guards to act the way they did, so rather than this behavior appearing on its own, it was generated by Zimbardo.

Prisoner abuse at Abu Ghraib Prison

Zimbardo reflects on the dramatic visual similarities between the behavior of the participants in the Stanford prison experiment, and the prisoner abuse at Abu Ghraib. He did not accept the Chairman of the Joint Chiefs of Staff, General Myers', claim that the events were due to a few rogue soldiers and that it did not reflect on the military. Instead he looked at the situation the soldiers were in and considered the possibility that this situation might have induced the behavior that they displayed. He began with the assumption that the abusers were not "bad apples" and were in a situation like that of the Stanford prison study, where physically and psychologically healthy people were behaving sadistically and brutalizing prisoners. Zimbardo became absorbed in trying to understand who these people were, asking the question "are they inexplicable, can we not understand them". This led him to write the book The Lucifer Effect.

The Lucifer Effect

The Lucifer Effect was written in response to his findings in the Stanford Prison Experiment. Zimbardo believes that personality characteristics could play a role in how violent or submissive actions are manifested. In the book, Zimbardo says that humans cannot be defined as good or evil because we have the ability to act as both especially at the hand of the situation. Examples include the events that occurred at the Abu Ghraib Detention Center, in which the defense team—including Gary Myers—argued that it was not the prison guards and interrogators that were at fault for the physical and mental abuse of detainees but the Bush administration policies themselves. According to Zimbardo, "Good people can be induced, seduced, and initiated into behaving in evil ways. They can also be led to act in irrational, stupid, self-destructive, antisocial, and mindless ways when they are immersed in 'total situations' that impact human nature in ways that challenge our sense of the stability and consistency of individual personality, of character, and of morality."(Zimbardo, The Lucifer Effect, p. 211)

In The Journal of the American Medical Association,

There are seven social processes that grease "the slippery slope of evil":
 Mindlessly taking the first small step
 Dehumanization of others
 De-individuation of self (anonymity)
 Diffusion of personal responsibility
 Blind obedience to authority
 Uncritical conformity to group norms
 Passive tolerance of evil through inaction or indifference

Time
In 2008, Zimbardo published his work with John Boyd about the Time Perspective Theory and the Zimbardo Time Perspective Inventory (ZTPI) in The Time Paradox: The New Psychology of Time That Will Change Your Life. In 2009, he met Richard Sword and started collaborating to turn the Time Perspective Theory into a clinical therapy, beginning a four-year long pilot study and establishing time perspective therapy. In 2009, Zimbardo did his Ted Talk  "The Psychology of Time"  about the Time Perspective Theory. According to this Ted Talk, there are six kinds of different Time Perspectives which are Past Positive TP (Time Perspective), Past Negative TP, Present Hedonism TP, Present Fatalism TP, Future Life Goal-Oriented TP and Future Transcendental TP.

In 2012, Zimbardo, Richard Sword, and his wife Rosemary authored a book called The Time Cure.

Time Perspective therapy bears similarities to Pause Button Therapy, developed by psychotherapist Martin Shirran, whom Zimbardo corresponded with and met at the first International Time Perspective Conference at the University of Coimbra, Portugal. Zimbardo wrote the foreword to the second edition of Shirran's book on the subject.

Heroic Imagination Project

As of 2014 Zimbardo is heading a movement for everyday heroism as the founder and director of the Heroic Imagination Project (HIP), a non-profit organization dedicated to promoting heroism in everyday life. The project is currently collecting data from former American gang members and individuals with former ties to terrorism for comparison, in an attempt to better understand how individuals change violent behavior. This research portion of the project is co-headed by Rony Berger, Yotam Heineburg, and Leonard Beckum.  He published an article contrasting heroism and altruism in 2011 with Zeno Franco and Kathy Blau in the Review of General Psychology.

Social intensity syndrome (SIS)
In 2008, Zimbardo began working with Sarah Brunskill and Anthony Ferreras on a new theory called the social intensity syndrome (SIS). SIS is a new term coined to describe and normalize the effects military culture has on the socialization of both active soldiers and veterans. Zimbardo and Brunskill presented the new theory and a preliminary factor analysis of it accompanying survey at the Western Psychological Association in 2013. Brunskill finished the data collection in December 2013. Through an exploratory component factor analysis, confirmatory factor analysis, internal consistency and validity tests demonstrated that SIS was a reliable and valid construct of measuring military socialization.

Other endeavors

After the prison experiment, Zimbardo decided to look for ways he could use psychology to help people; this led to the founding of The Shyness Clinic in Menlo Park, California, which treats shy behavior in adults and children. Zimbardo's research on shyness resulted in several bestselling books on the topic. Other subjects he has researched include mind control and cultic behavior.

Zimbardo is the co-author of an introductory Psychology textbook entitled Psychology and Life, which is used in many American undergraduate psychology courses. He also hosted a PBS TV series titled Discovering Psychology which is used in many college telecourses.

In 2004, Zimbardo testified for the defense in the court martial of Sgt. Ivan "Chip" Frederick, a guard at Abu Ghraib prison. He argued that Frederick's sentence should be lessened due to mitigating circumstances, explaining that few individuals can resist the powerful situational pressures of a prison, particularly without proper training and supervision. The judge apparently disregarded Zimbardo's testimony, and gave Frederick the maximum 8-year sentence. Zimbardo drew on the knowledge he gained from his participation in the Frederick case to write a new book entitled The Lucifer Effect: Understanding How Good People Turn Evil, about the connections between Abu Ghraib and the prison experiments.

Zimbardo's writing appeared in Greater Good Magazine, published by the Greater Good Science Center of the University of California, Berkeley. Zimbardo's contributions include the interpretation of scientific research into the roots of compassion, altruism, and peaceful human relationships. His most recent article with Greater Good magazine is entitled: "The Banality of Heroism", which examines how ordinary people can become everyday heroes. In February 2010, Zimbardo was a guest presenter at the Science of a Meaningful Life seminar: Goodness, Evil, and Everyday Heroism, along with Greater Good Science Center Executive Director Dacher Keltner.

Zimbardo, who officially retired in 2003, gave his final "Exploring Human Nature" lecture on March 7, 2007, on the Stanford campus, bringing his teaching career of 50 years to a close. David Spiegel, professor of psychiatry at the Stanford University School of Medicine, called Zimbardo "a legendary teacher", saying that "he has changed the way we think about social influences."

Zimbardo has made appearances on American TV, such as The Daily Show with Jon Stewart on March 29, 2007, The Colbert Report on February 11, 2008 and Dr. Phil on October 25, 2010.

Zimbardo serves as advisor to the anti-bullying organization Bystander Revolution and appears in the organization's videos to explain the bystander effect and discuss the evil of inaction.

Since 2003, Zimbardo has been active in charitable and economic work in rural Sicily through the Zimbardo-Luczo Fund with Steve Luczo and the local director , which provides scholarships for academically gifted students from Corleone and Cammarata.

In 2015, Zimbardo co-authored a book "Man (Dis)connected: How Technology Has Sabotaged What It Means To Be Male", which collected research to support a thesis that males are increasingly disconnected from society. He argues that a lack of two-parent households and female-oriented schooling have made it more attractive to live virtually, risking video game addiction or pornography addiction.

Recognition
In 2012, Zimbardo received the American Psychological Foundation Gold Medal for Lifetime Achievement in the Science of Psychology.

In 2011, he received an honorary doctorate degree from SWPS University in Warsaw.

In 2003, Zimbardo and University of Rome La Sapienza scholars Gian Vittorio Caprara, and Claudio Barbaranelli were awarded the sarcastic Ig Nobel Award for Psychology for their report "Politicians' Uniquely Simple Personalities".

Works
 Influencing attitude and changing behavior: A basic introduction to relevant methodology, theory, and applications (Topics in social psychology), Addison Wesley, 1969
 The Cognitive Control of Motivation. Glenview, IL:  Scott, Foresman, 1969
 Stanford prison experiment: A simulation study of the psychology of imprisonment,  Philip G. Zimbardo, Inc., 1972
 Influencing Attitudes and Changing Behavior. Reading, MA:  Addison Wesley Publishing Co.,  1969,  
 Canvassing for Peace:  A Manual for Volunteers. Ann Arbor, MI:  Society for the Psychological Study of Social Issues, 1970, ISBN
 Influencing Attitudes and Changing Behavior (2nd ed.).  Reading, MA: Addison Wesley., 1977, ISBN
 Psychology and You, with David Dempsey (1978).
 Shyness: What It Is, What to Do About It, Addison Wesley, 1990, 
 The Psychology of Attitude Change and Social Influence. New York: McGraw-Hill, 1991, 
 Psychology (3rd Edition), Reading, MA:  Addison Wesley Publishing Co.,  1999, 
 The Shy Child : Overcoming and Preventing Shyness from Infancy to Adulthood, Malor Books, 1999, 
 Violence Workers: Police Torturers and Murderers Reconstruct Brazilian Atrocities. Berkeley, CA: University of California Press, 2002, 
 Psychology - Core Concepts, 5/e, Allyn & Bacon Publishing, 2005, 
 Psychology And Life, 17/e, Allyn & Bacon Publishing, 2005, 
 The Lucifer Effect: Understanding How Good People Turn Evil, Random House, New York, 2007, 
 The Time Paradox: The New Psychology of Time That Will Change Your Life, Simon & Schuster, New York, 2008, 
 The Journey from the Bronx to Stanford to Abu Ghraib, pp. 85–104 in "Journeys in Social Psychology: Looking Back to Inspire the Future", edited by Robert Levine, et al., CRC Press, 2008. 
 Salvatore Cianciabella (prefazione di Philip Zimbardo, nota introduttiva di Liliana De Curtis). Siamo uomini e caporali. Psicologia della dis-obbedienza. Franco Angeli, 2014. . siamouominiecaporali.it 
 Maschi in difficoltà, Zimbardo, Philip, Coulombe, Nikita D., Cianciabella, Salvatore (a cura di), FrancoAngeli Editore, 2017.
 Man (Dis)connected, Zimbardo, Philip, Coulombe, Nikita D., Rider/ Ebury Publishing, United Kingdom, 2015, 
 Man Interrupted: Why Young Men are Struggling & What We Can Do About It. Philip Zimbardo, Nikita Coulombe; Conari Press, 2016.

See also
 Human experimentation in the United States
 List of social psychologists
 Banality of evil

References

External links

 
 The Heroic Imagination Project
 Philip G. Zimbardo Papers (Stanford University Archives)
 
 
 
 
 Philip Zimbardo on the Lucifer Effect, in two parts
 "Critical Situations: The Evolution of a Situational Psychologist - A Conversation with Philip Zimbardo" , Ideas Roadshow, 2016

1933 births
American people of Italian descent
American social psychologists
Brooklyn College alumni
Crowd psychologists
Living people
New York University faculty
Presidents of the American Psychological Association
Stanford University Department of Psychology faculty
Yale Graduate School of Arts and Sciences alumni